You're Still The One is a 2015 Filipino romantic drama film directed by Chris Martinez and starring Maja Salvador, Dennis Trillo, Richard Yap and Ellen Adarna. It was distributed by Star Cinema and Regal Entertainment and was released on May 27, 2015.

This is also the last film appearance of comedienne Joy Viado, who died in a heart attack in Diliman, Quezon City on September 10, 2016 at the age of 57.

Plot
University student Ellise erroneously thinks that she sent a nude photo to composer Jojo and the two become best friends. Eventually, Jojo wants to be more than friends, but Ellise is reluctant in case it does not work out.

Cast 
 Maja Salvador as Ellise
 Dennis Trillo as Jojo
 Richard Yap as Vincent
 Ellen Adarna as Racquel
 Zsa Zsa Padilla as Cecilia
 Snooky Serna as Melissa
 Lito Pimentel as Eric
 Joshua Garcia as Ericson
 Melai Cantiveros as Meanne
 Jason Francisco as Dong
 Jinri Park as Evelyn
 Manuel Chua as Ariel
 Frances Ignacio as Terry
 Ina Raymundo
 AJ Dee
 Joy Viado

References

External links 
 
 

2015 films
Philippine romantic drama films
2015 romantic drama films
Star Cinema films
Regal Entertainment films
2010s Tagalog-language films
2010s English-language films
2015 multilingual films
Philippine multilingual films
Films directed by Chris Martinez